Superbe was a  74-gun ship of the line of the French Navy.

Career
Superbe was built at Antwerp, in a late effort of the First French Empire to replenish the French Navy by using all available shipyards. Particularly well-built, to the point of being called the "nicest ship in the Navy", she became the only ship built at Antwerp to survive breaking up after the Bourbon Restoration.

Superbe served in the Caribbean before returning to Brest to be put in the reserve in an inactive state.

In 1830, Superbe took part in the French invasion of Algiers, after which she returned to Toulon to be decommissioned again.

In 1833, Superbe served in the Mediterranean under Captain d'Oysonville. On 15 December 1833, she was caught in a storm in the Aegean Sea off Paros and ran aground at the entrance of Parekia harbour.

Notes, citations, and references

Notes

Citations

References

Ships of the line of the French Navy
Téméraire-class ships of the line
1814 ships
Maritime incidents in December 1833
Shipwrecks of Greece
Shipwrecks in the Aegean Sea